Wijdewormer is a hamlet in the Dutch province of North Holland. It is located in the municipality of Wormerland, about 5 km east of the town of Wormer, in the polder "De Wijde Wormer". De Wijde Wormer was poldered in 1626.

Wijdewormer was a separate municipality between 1817 and 1991, when it became a part of Wormerland.

References

Former municipalities of North Holland
Populated places in North Holland
Wormerland